The second series of the Australian cookery game show MasterChef Australia premiered on 19 April 2010 on Network Ten, concluding on 25 July 2010 when Adam Liaw was named the winner.

The series finale was predicted to be such a success with ratings that it forced a national election debate between Prime Minister Julia Gillard and Opposition Leader Tony Abbott to a different time slot due to a fear of low ratings.

The "Winner Announced" was watched by an average national audience of 5.29 million, peaking at 5.74 million. The consolidated 5 city metropolitan audience was 4.03 million (the second highest rating program since the current ratings system began in 2001) and the consolidated regional audience was 1.26 million.

Changes
The second series of MasterChef Australia brought some changes to the format of the show. Most notably, Sarah Wilson, host of Series 1, is not present in the second series, with producers opting instead to use the show's three judges as hosts.

Furthermore, Series 2 began with the 'Top 50' component of the show, as opposed to the auditions phase. This allows for the audience to begin identifying and connect with contestants while allowing for more time to be spent in the actual competition phase of the show.

Another change to the show is the reward for winning a Celebrity Chef Challenge. In Series 1, the winner would receive a free pass through to the final week of the competition. This was problematic in that it removed the contestant from the show altogether, meaning they didn't keep themselves in the pressured situations that the others had. Instead, in Series 2, a successful contestant will now receive an 'Immunity Pin', which they could use at any time during the competition to save themselves from elimination except in finals week. Out of all the Celebrity Chef Challenges, only Marion managed to win the immunity pin by defeating a Celebrity Chef (Adam also won an immunity pin, but not by defeating a Celebrity Chef).

Also different in Series 2 is the elimination after a team challenge. In Series 1, all the contestants from the losing team had to vote off someone from the competition. This was problematic in that contestants might vote off the best contestants in hopes of improving their chances of winning the show. Instead, in Series 2, the elimination process has changed. A variety of different challenges have been used to determine which member of the losing team is eliminated:
 Basic Skills Test – contestants perform tasks testing basic skills, such as separating egg yolks and whites, making a pesto sauce or naming herbs. Such challenges may be split into rounds, with a 'best of 3' method used, the judges may choose the worst performer or else a sudden death elimination process is used.
 "Fix that Dish" – contestants are given a badly prepared dish, and are tasked with fixing it. The judges eliminate the contestant whose dish is the least impressive.
 "Name that Dish" - contestants are given an array of dishes of the same type, for example, cakes, and asked to name them to gain safety, incorrect naming results in elimination or sending to the next round.
 Taste Test – contestants take turns naming ingredients in a provided dish (such as a bouillabaisse or a curry). The first contestant to either name an ingredient that is not in the dish or to fail to name an ingredient is eliminated.
 Mystery Box – in a variation of the regular Mystery Box Challenge, team members are tasked with preparing a dish that also fits a criterion (for example, complementing a bottle of wine)

Furthermore, the selection of members from the losing team to face elimination has varied. In some weeks, the judges select the worst two performers, in other weeks the entire team must compete in the elimination challenge. In one week, the team members had to nominate three members themselves.

From Week 4, Donna Hay replaced Gary Mehigan on the judging panel during the Celebrity Chef Challenges. This was done to allow Mehigan to act as a facilitator in the kitchen during the challenge (this was ex-host Sarah Wilson's role in Series 1).

During the filming of Week 7, Mehigan injured his leg, and consequently was unable to film episodes. During the time in which he was injured, Matt Moran acted as a fill-in judge starting from Celebrity Chef Challenge 6 and continuing until Mehigan returned during Week 8.

Euro Week
Airing from 20 June, the remaining eight MasterChef contestants travelled to London for the first stop in "Euro Week". Later in the week they went to Paris, where they competed in what has been called the "ultimate super-challenge". Celebrity Cooks who have appeared include Jamie Oliver, Heston Blumenthal, Martin Blunos and Brett Graham.
The Icelandic volcano eruption in 2010 caused filming to be delayed.

Contestants
The top 24 contestants were chosen throughout the first week of challenges amongst the top 50. The full group of 24 were revealed on Sunday, 25 April:

Future appearances

 Callum Hann appeared on the 1st Junior Series as a guest judge.
 In Series 3 Alvin Quah and Jimmy Seervai gave cooking lessons at Masterclass.
 In Series 4 Adam Liaw appeared as a guest judge for a Mystery Box Challenge.
 Callum took part in a Special All Star Series for Charity along with Marion Grasby, Jonathan Daddia and Aaron Harvie. Aaron came 11th, Jonathan came 9th, Marion came 8th and Callum became the winner.
 In Series 5 Adam appeared at the Grand Final.
 In Series 6 Adam appeared as a guest judge for a Mystery Box Challenge and invention Test.
 In a Superstar themed week on Series 7 Callum as a guest chef for an Immunity challenge where he managed to win over Series 7 contestant Anna Webster and appeared for a Masterclass.
 In Series 10 Adam appeared at the auditions to support the Top 50, while Callum appeared during South Australian week for a Masterclass.
 Callum appeared on Series 12 along with Courtney Roulston. Courtney was eliminated on 21 April 2020, finishing 23rd and Callum was eliminated on 14 July 2020, finishing 4th.
 Callum also appeared in Series 13 as a guest judge for an elimination challenge.
 In Series 14 Alvin appeared for another chance to win the title. Alvin was eliminated on 3 July 2022, finishing 6th.

Special guests
 Donna Hay – Top 50 Pressure Test 1, Celebrity Chef Challenge 3–6, 8, 10 onwards, MasterClass 10
 Matt Moran – Top 50 Pressure Test 2, MasterClass 1, Celebrity Chef Challenge 6, MasterClass 7, Celebrity Chef Challenge 7, Finale Night
 Neil Perry – Top 50 Pressure Test 3, Team Challenge 8
 Luke Nguyen – Celebrity Chef Challenge 1, MasterClass 2
 Luke Mangan – Team Challenge Reward 1
 Peter Gilmore – Pressure Test 1, MasterClass 6, Finale Night
 Philippa Sibley – Celebrity Chef Challenge 2
 Nathan Darling – Team Challenge Reward 2
 Shaun Presland – MasterClass 3, Celebrity Chef Challenge 12
 Justin North – Celebrity Chef Challenge 3, MasterClass 4, MasterClass Reunion
 Tony Bilson – Team Challenge 3
 Michel Roux – Team Challenge 3
 Tetsuya Wakuda – Team Challenge 3
 Guillaume Brahimi – Team Challenge 3
 Giovanni Pilu – Team Challenge Reward 3
 Kumar Mahadevan – MasterClass 4
 Adam Humphrey – Celebrity Chef Challenge 4
 Lovaine Allen – Celebrity Chef Challenge 4
 Aaron Eady – Celebrity Chef Challenge 4
 Curtis Stone – Team Challenge 4
 Ty Bellingham – Team Challenge Reward 4
 Peter Kuruvita – MasterClass 5, MasterClass Reunion
 Stephanie Alexander – Pressure Test 4
 Frank Camorra – Celebrity Chef Challenge 5
 Glenn Thompson – Team Challenge Reward 5
 Rick Stein – Pressure Test 5
 Maggie Beer – Celebrity Chef Challenge 6, Finals Week Elimination 3
 Mark Jensen – Team Challenge Reward 6
 Fergus Henderson – Masterclass 7
 Damien Pignolet – Pressure Test 6
 Ian Curley – Celebrity Chef Challenge 7
 Kylie Kwong – Celebrity Chef Challenge 7, Masterclass 8, Signature Dish Challenge
 Brent Savage – Team Challenge 7
 Ryan Squires – Team Challenge 7
 David Chang – Team Challenge Reward 7
 Darren Purchese – Masterclass 8
 Will Studd – Masterclass 8
 Julie Goodwin – Invention Test 8, Masterclass 9
 Josh Emett – Celebrity Chef Challenge 8
 Warren Turnbull – Team Challenge Reward 8
 Michael Klausen – Masterclass 9
 Cherish Finden – Invention Test 9
 Jamie Oliver – Invention Test Reward 1
 Heston Blumenthal – Pressure Test 8
 John Torode – Celebrity Chef Challenge 9
 Gregg Wallace – Celebrity Chef Challenge 9
 Martin Blunos – Celebrity Chef Challenge 9
 Franck Poupard – Super Challenge
 Shane Osbourne – Super Challenge Reward
 Brett Graham – Elimination Challenge 9
 Mitchell Orr – Celebrity Chef Challenge 10
 Jan ter Heerdt – Masterclass 11
 Margaret Fulton – Invention Test 10
 Adriano Zumbo – Pressure Test 9, Finals Week Elimination 1
 Adam Melonas – Celebrity Chef Challenge 11
 Sean Moran – Team Challenge Reward 9
 Lauren Murdoch – Masterclass 12
 Christine Manfield – Pressure Test 10, Masterclass 13
 Alla Wolf-Tasker – Signature Dish Challenge
 Mark Best – Signature Dish Challenge
 Jacques Reymond – Signature Dish Challenge
 Hiroyuki Sakai – Invention Test 12
 Shannon Bennett – Finals Week Elimination 2
Many of the guest chefs returned for the announcement of the winner.

Elimination chart

  In Week 1, nobody from the top 24 was eliminated. During this week the judges selected the twenty-four finalists from the top 50.
  In Week 2, instead of the traditional Invention Test, contestants were asked to recreate a favourite childhood food memory. There was no Bottom 3 for this challenge.
  In Week 4, the entire losing team faced off in two Elimination Challenge rounds. The Bottom 3 were decided from the first challenge, and had to compete in the second challenge.
  In Week 5, contestants were grouped in threes for the Invention Test and the winning team all competed in the Celebrity Chef challenge.
  Also in Week 5, the Team Challenge was a dead heat. The bottom two contestants from each team were sent into the Elimination Challenge.
  In Week 6, there was no Mystery Box challenge. Instead, contestants took part in a pizza making challenge.
  Also in Week 6, Marion, as Invention Test winner, was not in either team and so was safe from elimination. She joined the winning team on their reward. Further, the entire losing team faced elimination, from which a Bottom 3 was selected.
  In Week 7, the calibre of dishes in the Invention Test was such that a Top 6 was selected.
  Also in Week 7, contestants in the losing team from the Team Challenge were asked to select the bottom 3 performers themselves. In the subsequent Elimination Challenge, Marion chose to use her immunity pin and not take part in the challenge.
  In Week 8, contestants were paired up for the Invention Test and the winning pair competed against each other to win immunity in a modified Celebrity Chef Challenge.
  In Week 10, as part of "Euro Week," there was no Mystery Box Challenge, and therefore the advantages gained by winning it were negated. There was no Bottom 3 for the Invention Test.
  Also in Week 10, as part of "Euro Week," the Pressure Test was not an elimination challenge, but contestants competed to win the chance to take part in the Celebrity Chef Challenge. Marion won the challenge.
  In Week 11, there was no Invention Test and no Pressure Test elimination. Instead, eleven previously eliminated contestants returned to compete to win a spot back in the competition. In the following Celebrity Chef Challenge, the Top 10 contestants all competed against the Celebrity Chef for a chance at immunity. In the Elimination Challenge, neither Aaron nor Jimmy was eliminated as the judges could not agree on the worst dish.
  In Week 12, contestants were paired up for the Invention Test and the winning pair had to decide which of them would compete in the Celebrity Chef Challenge. As Adam already had an immunity pin and it was Claire's first Invention Test win, Adam deferred to Claire.
  Also in Week 12, Adam chose to use his immunity pin and not take part in the Elimination challenge following the Team Challenge.
  In Week 13, there was only a Bottom 3 for the Invention Test, with the winner of the Mystery Box Challenge gaining the advantages normally given to the Invention Test winner. As the winner, Claire did not take part in the Invention Test, and therefore escaped possible elimination.
  On Sunday, Finals Week, contestants split into two teams to compete in the Invention Test. The winning team's prize was an advantage in the Pressure Test that all contestants would compete in the following day. They were shown the dish and given the recipe for it, thus giving them the night to prepare.
  On Monday, Finals Week, contestants faced a Pressure Test. Having won the challenge, Jimmy was given an advantage in the Mystery Box Challenge that all contestants would compete in the following day: the power to choose the contents for the Mystery Box.
  On Tuesday, Finals Week, contestants faced a Mystery Box Challenge. 
  On Wednesday, Finals Week, contestants faced a "Cookbook Challenge," where they made dishes they would include in their cookbook, should they win the title. There was no winner for this challenge.
  On Thursday, Finals Week, contestants prepared a three course meal for the Governor General, Her Excellency Quentin Bryce and thirty of her guests. 
  Adam and Callum competed against each other in three rounds consisting of a Basic Skills and Knowledge Test, an Invention Test and a Pressure Test. Points were awarded for each test, with the winner decided based on the final tally after the three rounds.

Episodes and Ratings

References

2010 Australian television seasons
MasterChef Australia
Television shows shot in London
Television shows filmed in France